Song Yaxuan (simplified Chinese: 宋亚轩; traditional Chinese: 宋亞軒, born March 4, 2004), is a Chinese idol, actor, and singer. He is the main vocal of the Chinese boy band .

Early life and education 
Song Yaxuan was born on March 4, 2004, in Binzhou City, Shandong, China. He grew up with his grandparents until age six when he moved to Guangzhou with his parents. He attended elementary school and middle school in Guangzhou. He attended high school at Bashu Secondary School in Chongqing. 

Song Yaxuan's achievement was confirmed and covered by multiple news and media articles. Early in 2022, He ranked 11th in the audition for arts student at The Central Academy of Drama majoring in Acting and Performance and is a current student.

Career

2015–2016: Pre-Trainee Years 
In 2015, Song Yaxuan entered the singing contest STAR-CHINA and won the Starry Award at the age of eleven. Later in 2015, he joined a kid's variety program on Guangdong Cartoon Network called It's Really Fun!

In early 2016, he made his debut on BRTV's music variety “” and earned public attention throughout China for his cover of Brightest Star in the Night Sky originally sung by Chinese indie-rock band Escape Plan.

Throughout the year, Song Yaxuan had been performing in various occasions like charity shows held in the Great Hall of People singing his cover of the Brightest Star in the Night Sky on BRTV's food variety.

2016–2018: Trainee at TF Entertainment 
On November 1, 2016, Song Yaxuan joined  (TF Entertainment) and attended the company's self-made program "The Typhoon Talk" and "Friday Trainees".

On April 14, 2017, Song Yaxuan performed Blossomy on the TV Show Tian Tian Xiang Shang.

In September 2017, Song Yaxuan was an actor in TF Entertainment's self-made series The Second Life.

On October 16, 2017, Song Yaxuan performed, with 9 others, the song "Journal of Superboys" on Happy Camp and at the Spring Festival Gala Audition by the end of 2017.

He also performed at the MangoTV New Year countdown live for 2018.

2018–2019: Typhoon Teens (TYT) 

In February 2019, Song Yaxuan performed live at the Spring Festival Gala with TYT.

On February 16, 2019, Song Yaxuan performed in TYT's first and only concert, V5.

On July 19, 2019, Song Yaxuan participated in TF Entertainment's reality TV show Typhoon Project to determine who will be assigned to the new boy group after Typhoon Teens was disbanded.

2019–present: Teens in Times (TNT) 
On August 25, 2019, Song Yaxuan ranked the 3rd place in Typhoon Project.

On January 29, 2021, Song Yaxuan joined as a semi-permanent guest host for the show Ace vs. Ace for Season 6. Song also became the host for its derivative show "Ace Boy Loading".

On May 28, 2021, Song Yaxuan was a guest on the variety show The Detectives' Adventures.

In 2022, Song Yaxuan sang in the 2022 Beijing Winter Olympics' theme song "The Most Beautiful Chinese Painting".

On February 25, 2022, Song Yaxuan became main host for "Ace Boy Loading" in Ace vs. Ace Season 7.

On March 23, 2022, Song Yaxuan became a main host on the television program "Three Boys".

Personal life 
Song Yaxuan has a brother who is 8 years younger.

Filmography

Television series

Short films

Variety shows

Television commercials

Stage drama

Other ventures

Endorsements 
In October 2019, Handu Yishe announced Teens in Times as its new brand ambassador.

In February 2021, La Roche-Posay announced Teens in Times as its new brand ambassador.

In February 2021, C-beauty brand Florasis announced Teens in Times as its new global brand ambassador.

In August 2021, Skechers announced Teens in Times as its new brand ambassador.

In June 2022, Teens in Times "join the likes of Yifei Liu, Zhou Dongyu, Zhong Chuxi, Gong Jun, and Dilraba Dilmurat as the latest China market-focused ambassadors" for the French luxury house brand Louis Vuitton.

Fashion 
On April 12, 2021, Song Yaxuan was invited as celebrity model for the Dior RTW Fall Winter 2021 show in Shanghai, marking his first solo appearances in fashion venues.

On November 27, 2021, Teens in Times was invited to Louis Vuitton LVAND 2021 in Shenzhen.

On June 23, 2022, Teens in Times was announced as Louis Vuitton's new global brand ambassador and was invited to promote the LV Spring Summer ’23 Men's Collection Show in Paris.

Spokesperson 
On June 23, 2022, SDTV published a video of Song Yaxuan introducing and promoting his hometown Binzhou as a city spokesperson. On the same day, Binzhou News published an interview with Song. The interview was conducted right after Song finished his university entrance exam.

References 

2004 births
People from Binzhou
Chinese male singers
Chinese idols
Living people
Chinese male actors
21st-century Chinese male actors
Male actors from Shandong
Central Academy of Drama alumni